Too Hot to Handle may refer to:

Film 
Too Hot to Handle (1938 film), a 1938 film starring Clark Gable
Too Hot to Handle, a 1950 documentary film depicting a burlesque show
Too Hot to Handle (1960 film), a 1960 film starring Jayne Mansfield and directed by Terence Young, which was released in the United States with the title Playgirl After Dark
Too Hot to Handle (1977 film), a 1977 action film starring Cheri Caffaro
The Marrying Man, a 1991 film which was re-titled Too Hot to Handle in the UK and Australia

Television 
"Too Hot to Handle", an episode of the 1973 Super Friends series
"Too Hot to Handle", an episode of the 1987 Teenage Mutant Ninja Turtles animated series
"Too Hot to Handle", an episode of The Super Mario Bros. Super Show!
"Too Hot to Handle", an episode of The Dreamstone
Too Hot to Handle (TV series), a 2020 Netflix original reality TV show.

Music 
"Too Hot to Handle", a 1977 song by UFO on the album Lights Out
Too Hot to Handle (Heatwave album), a 1977 album and track by Heatwave
Too Hot to Handle (Jorma Kaukonen album), a 1985 album by Jorma Kaukonen

Other uses 
Moonraker (novel), a 1955 James Bond novel renamed as Too Hot to Handle in the United States